Gallant is a surname. Notable people with the surname include:

 A. Ronald Gallant (born 1942), American econometrician
 Brett Gallant (born 1990), Canadian curler
 Brian Gallant (born 1982), Canadian Liberal politician
 Cheryl Gallant (born 1960), Canadian Conservative politician
 Christopher Gallant (born 1992), American singer-songwriter known by the mononym Gallant
 Corinne Gallant (born 1922), Canadian philosophy professor and feminist
 Gary William Gallant (born 1972), Canadian professional wrestler who wrestles under the ring name Gary Williams
 Gerard Gallant (born 1963), Canadian ice hockey coach and retired player
 Gord Gallant (born 1950), Canadian retired ice hockey player
 Hubert Gallant (born 1955), Canadian retired professional wrestler
 John Gallant (born 1978), Canadian lacrosse player
 Jonathan Gallant (born 1976), Canadian rock bass guitarist. 
 Karl Gallant, American congressional aide and lobbyist
 Lennie Gallant (born 1955), Canadian singer-songwriter
 Matt Gallant (born 1964), American television host
 Mavis Gallant (1922–2014), Canadian writer
 Patsy Gallant (born 1948), Canadian pop singer and musical theatre actress
 Peter Gallant (born 1958), Canadian curler
 Shannon Gallant (born 1986), Australian rugby league player
 Thomas Gallant, American oboist
 Thomas Gallant (historian), American historian
Fictional characters:
 Felicia Gallant, a romance novelist in the TV Soap Opera Another World
 Michael Gallant, a medical doctor in the TV Series ER